In the Mirror is a compilation album by keyboardist and composer Yanni, released on the Private Music label in 1997. The album peaked at number 1 on Billboards Top New Age Albums chart and at number 17 on the Billboard 200 chart in the same year.

Background
This compilation is often billed as a Compilation of Yanni favorites. It includes "In the Mirror" which is a solo piano piece and faster paced tracks such as "Forbidden Dreams" and "Chasing Shadows". "Aria" is specially presented in this album as performed in concert on the album Live at the Acropolis.

Critical reception

In a review by Jonathan Widran of AllMusic: "Perhaps Private Music thought it could fool the casual Yanni fan by its continuous releasing of various collections by the New-age superstar, but the buyer should beware that a good handful of songs from this collection are also available on the recording Devotion: The Best of Yanni. Should you not already have that one, In the Mirror makes for a good introduction to the man and his music, both for its quieter romantic aspects (the title track, the acoustic piano gem 'In the Morning Light') and more rambunctious synth adventures ('Within Attraction'). While many simply think Yanni composes overly sweet, featherweight themes and floats them over synth strings, there's sometimes a slightly richer artistry at work here. 'Enchantment', for instance, is classically influenced, while 'So Long My Friend' and 'The End of August' are truly thoughtful elegies that run deeper than most of his compositions. His most familiar tunes, like 'A Love for Life' and 'Face in the Photograph', are on hand as well, as is the live version of the exotic, slightly bombastic chant tune, 'Aria'. This disc being quintessential Yanni, his fans will love it while detractors...well, maybe they should be looking in a slightly different mirror".

Track listing

Certifications

References

External links
Official Website

Yanni albums
1997 compilation albums